Marco Cochrane (born 1962) is an American sculptor born in Venice, Italy, best known for his large-scale steel sculptures of nude women.

Early and personal life
Cochrane was born in Venice to American artists and raised in Berkeley, California. When he was seven years old, a friend, then aged nine, was abducted and raped; Cochrane recalls "[m]y mom told me about it in way too much gory detail. It really shocked me," adding he was also surprised when "nobody did anything — and nobody ever talked about it again" and wondered "if he had realized she was a person, he wouldn't have done it."

Cochrane is self-taught in sculpture and married to Julia Whitelaw.

The Bliss Project

Bliss Dance, Truth is Beauty and R-Evolution collectively form The Bliss Project, a trilogy of steel sculptures. The model for each piece was the singer and dancer Deja Solis. Cochrane met Solis in 2006 and asked her to model for a work in progress. During their fifth collaboration, Solis advanced the idea for the pose that would be sculpted as Bliss Dance.

A three-stage process was used to create each final piece:
 Cochrane sculpts Solis in clay as she holds the pose, and then casts a -scale plaster model from the clay
 Cochrane sculpts an intermediate clay model enlarged by 3× over the plaster model using a pantograph
 Cochrane and volunteers weld a final steel model enlarged by 3× over the intermediate clay using a pantograph

The finished sculptures use steel rod and tubing connected by steel balls for the structure, finished with a stainless steel mesh skin lit by LEDs.

The first piece, entitled Bliss Dance (2010), reaches  in height and, after being introduced at Burning Man, was given a location on San Francisco's Treasure Island, where it remained until May 18, 2015. Bliss Dance later moved permanently to The Park, an entertainment venue near T-Mobile Arena on the Las Vegas Strip, which opened on April 4, 2016.

A smaller scale piece by Cochrane will be showcased at the Renwick Gallery. It was a response to the rape and abduction of a childhood friend, and moved to a permanent location at the San Leandro Tech Campus in the fall of 2016, where it is visible from the San Leandro BART station. The piece was chosen by developer Westlake Urban to fulfill the city's requirement to spend one percent of the project budget on art.

R-Evolution (2015), the third and final sculpture in The Bliss Project series, debuted at Burning Man in 2015 and has not yet found a permanent home.

References

External links

Bliss Dance
 Bliss Dance at Atlas Obscura

Truth is Beauty
 
 
 

20th-century American sculptors
Living people
1962 births
Sculptors from Venice
21st-century American sculptors